Alan Welch (3 November 1910 – 15 August 1980) was an Australian rules footballer who played for the South Melbourne Football Club in the Victorian Football League (VFL).

Notes

External links 

1910 births
1980 deaths
Australian rules footballers from Victoria (Australia)
Sydney Swans players